The Maltese National Amateur League (referred to as the IZIBet Amateur League for sponsorship reasons) is the third-highest division in Maltese football, replacing the Maltese Second Division and Maltese Third Division during the 2020–21 season following the premature end of the previous football season due to the COVID-19 pandemic.

Format 
Following the merger of the Maltese Second and Third Divisions the league is made up of two groups. Over the course of the season, each team plays twice against the others in their group. Three points are awarded for a win, one for a draw and zero for a loss. The teams are ranked in the table by:
 Total points gained

In the need of a tie-breaker, a play-off game is played. At the end of the season, the top team from each group is directly promoted to the Challenge League; an additional place is reserved for the winner of the promotion play-offs. The play-offs take place between the clubs that finished second to fourth in each group with the winning team gaining promotion to the Challenge League.

In March 2021, Luqa St. Andrew's became the first champions of the league and were promoted from group stage along with Melita and Mġarr United. They were joined in the 2021-22 Challenge League by the winners of the promotion play-offs Rabat Ajax who had beaten Kirkop United in the final. With five teams being relegated from the Challenge League in 2021, and four being promoted from the Amateur League, the 2021-22 season saw an overall increase of clubs to 23.

Venues

References

External links 
  on Malta Football Association

Maltese National Amateur League seasons
3
Third level football leagues in Europe